Picard may refer to:
Picardy, a region of France
Picard language, a language of France
Jean-Luc Picard, a fictional character in the Star Trek franchise

Places
 Picard, California, USA
 Picard, Quebec, Canada
 Picard (crater), a lunar impact crater in Mare Crisium

People
Picard (name), a French surname (includes a list of people with this name)
Picards, a religious sect in the fifteenth century

Star Trek
The family of Jean-Luc Picard, see List of Star Trek characters (N-S);
Star Trek: Picard, a television series focusing on the character of Jean-Luc Picard

Other uses
Picard (satellite), an orbiting solar observatory built by CNES
Picard (grape), an alternative name for several wine grape varieties
TSS Duke of Cumberland or Picard, a steamship that operated between Tilbury and Dunkirk from 1927 to 1936
Picard Surgelés, French retailer of frozen foods

See also

Berger Picard, French breed of dog of the herding group of breeds
Les Fatals Picards, a French band
MusicBrainz Picard, a cross platform tagger for MusicBrainz database
Picard group, a mathematical object describing the self-isomorphisms of a ringed space
Picard horn, a cone shaped formation that represents the 'shape' of the universe according to the Wilkinson Microwave Anisotropy Probe
Piccard, surname
Piccardo, surname
Pickard (disambiguation)